The Federal University of Southern Bahia (UFSB) is a public institution of higher education in Brazil.

UFSB was created by law 12.818/2013, signed by the president of Brazil, Dilma Rousseff. It started academic activities in September 2014. UFSB has 1610 students enrroled.

Campuses 
UFSB has three campuses: 
 Itabuna - Jorge Amado Campus
 Porto Seguro - Sosígenes Costa Campus
 Teixeira de Freitas - Paulo Freire Campus

Curriculum Architecture in Cycles 
The curricular organization in Cycles considers steps and stages of learning and development. The Cycle System offers forms to students to gain more independence on their course, with diversity and autonomy on their own curriculum. The Cycles ensures a better preparation, in function of a progressive conception of learning. In addition, the Cycles architecture puts UFSB in compatibility with organization forms used worldwide. The formation cycle at UFSB is configured this manner:

First Cycle: Interdisciplinary Bachelors (BI) and Interdisciplinary Licenciate (LI).

Second Cycle: Professional and academic graduation.

Third Cycle: including medical residency, master and doctorate degrees, among other credits.

References

External links 

 

Universities and colleges in Bahia
Bahia